The Christian Credit Party was a short-lived Canadian political party founded in 1982 by perennial candidate and social credit activist, John Turmel who has, at various times, been involved in the Social Credit Party of Canada, the Green Party of Canada, and the Libertarian Party of Canada.

Turmel and his brother Raymond ran unsuccessfully in federal by-elections in 1982 under the Christian Credit Party banner. The party disbanded in 1983 due to a lack of support. Turmel subsequently founded the Abolitionist Party of Canada with a similar program. The Abolitionist Party nominated candidates in the 1993 federal election.

See also
 List of political parties in Canada

References 
The biggest loser: John Turmel is making his 99th try for office this fall

Social credit parties in Canada
Federal political parties in Canada
Political parties established in 1982
Defunct political parties in Canada
Defunct Christian political parties
1982 establishments in Canada
Christian organizations based in Canada